Zacorisca heliaula is a species of moth of the family Tortricidae. It is found in the Philippines.

The wingspan is 28–29 mm. The forewings are orange, towards the apex broadly suffused with reddish. The hindwings are purple blackish with an orange apical patch.

References

	

Moths described in 1910
Zacorisca